The Robert Lee Norton House is a historic house located at 2045 Church Street in Cypress, Florida.

Description and history 
The Queen Anne style house was completed in 1904. It was added to the National Register of Historic Places on August 22, 1996.

References

External links
 Jackson County listings at National Register of Historic Places
 Jackson County listings at Florida's Office of Cultural and Historical Programs

Houses in Jackson County, Florida
Houses on the National Register of Historic Places in Florida
National Register of Historic Places in Jackson County, Florida
Queen Anne architecture in Florida
Houses completed in 1904